The Miss Perú 1954 pageant was held on July 26, 1954. That year 17 candidates competed for the national crown. The winner represented Peru at the Miss Universe 1954. The rest of the finalists would enter different pageants.

Placements

Special awards

 Best Regional Costume - Apurímac - Sonia Velázquez
 Miss Photogenic - Region Lima - Ruth Dedekind
 Miss Elegance - Region Lima - Ruth Dedekind
 Miss Congeniality - Huánuco - Frankie Mulánovich

Delegates

Apurímac - Sonia Velázquez
Ayacucho - Gloria Yolanda Villa
Cajamarca - Teresa Vigo
Callao - Lili Izanórtegui
Distrito Capital - Isabel León Velarde
Huancavelica - Lucy Cornejo
Huánuco - Frankie Mulánovich
Ica - Monique Uribe
Lambayeque - Adelaida Lugo

Loreto - Federica Gonzalez
Moquegua - Anastasia Estrada
Pasco - Rebecca Velazco
Region Lima - Ruth Dedekind
San Martín - Grace Becker
Tacna - Lucrecia Ruiz
Tumbes - Maria Candelaria Ferrer
USA Perú - Felicia Averitt

References 

Miss Peru
1954 in Peru
1954 beauty pageants